Golehin (also Romanized as Golehīn and Gelehīn; also known as Kalin) is a village in Abbas-e Sharqi Rural District, Tekmeh Dash District, Bostanabad County, East Azerbaijan Province, Iran. At the 2006 census, its population was 197, in 49 families.

References 

Populated places in Bostanabad County